Ardeshir Ruttonji Wadia (1888–1971) was an author from India who was awarded Padma Bhushan in 1961 by Government of India for his contribution to literature.
He was born in Mumbai in 1888 and studied law. A Parsee, he was educated at St Xavier's College, Wilson College, St Catharine's College, Oxford, and Cambridge University. From 1917 to 1942 he served as Professor and, for 3 years, as Dean at the University of Mysore. He served as a member of Mysore Legislative Council from 1930 to 1931 and from 1942 to 1943.
He was a nominated member of Rajya Sabha (the Upper House of Indian Parliament) from 1954 to 1966. He died in 1971.

Books

The Life and Teachings of Zoroaster
The Ethics of Feminism: A study of the revolt of woman
Democracy and society
The Bombay dockyard and the Wadia master builders
History and philosophy of social work in India
The Philosophy of Mahatma Gandhi: And Other Essays, Philosophical and Sociological

References

1888 births
1971 deaths
Parsi people from Mumbai
Nominated members of the Rajya Sabha
Writers from Mumbai
20th-century Indian essayists
Recipients of the Padma Bhushan in literature & education
Politicians from Mumbai
Indian social sciences writers
20th-century Indian politicians
20th-century Indian educational theorists
Writers in British India